Block 185 is an under construction office skyscraper located at 601 W. 2nd St. in Downtown Austin, Texas. The tower topped out in July 2021, and final completion is expected for Q2 2022. The tower is the fourth tallest in Austin at 594 feet, and the tallest office tower in Texas outside of Houston or Dallas. Block 185 is bound to the west by Shoal Creek, to the east by Nueces Street, to the north by Second Street and to the south by Cesar Chavez Street. The tower is located on the final parcel of the former Green Water Treatment Plant and in Austin's Second Street District.

History 
In the 1839 plan of Austin the property, along with three other adjoining properties, was designated for use as a penitentiary, however, a map of Austin from 1840 shows that lot split out into four tracks - Block 185, 186, 187 and 188. Eventually, the 1.26 acre plot of land would become the Green Water Treatment Plant  and, in 2012, it was purchased by a partnership between Trammel Crow and MSD Capital for $10,277,470. After many years of planning and many design changes, both increasing and decreasing in height, Block 185 started construction on January 16, 2019. Even after the groundbreaking, the tenants of the tower had not yet been announced and no renderings had been made public. On January 31, 2019, Brandywine announced that Google would lease the entire building, and the Austin-American Statesman released the first renderings the same day.

Architecture 
The building's unique design is due, in part, to setback requirements owing to its proximity to Shoal Creek and Lady Bird Lake. On the south side fronting Lady Bird Lake, this setback manifests itself as a series of receding terraces. On the west side, facing Shoal Creek, the tower's curtain-wall glass façade curves away from the creek, giving the building a sailboat like appearance. The tower has been called "the single most impressive skyscraper design we’ve seen in the city since the debut of the Frost Bank Tower".

References 

Skyscraper office buildings in Austin, Texas